Agonum hypocrita is a species of ground beetle in the genus Agonum that was discovered in 1904. The species can be found throughout Southern, Central and Northern Europe (except for Austria, Montenegro, Iceland, Ireland, and the United Kingdom). It is also found in Spain and Turkey.

References

hypocrita
Beetles described in 1904
Beetles of Asia
Beetles of Europe